Jamal al-Din Muhammad Isfahani was a Persian poet and painter from Isfahan, who was active in the second half of the 12th-century.

Modern scholarship acknowledges his ghazals being of high quality, as well as a forerunner of the ghazals of Saadi Shirazi (died 1291/92). 

Regardless, opinions about Jamal al-Din are varying. Saeed Nafisi regarded him as "the greatest Iranian poet of the 12th century" and "the most eloquent poet of Iran after Unsuri." Wahid Dastgerdi considers Jamal al-Din to have been the only one that could challenge the poet Sanai (died 1131/41). The opinions of Badiozzaman Forouzanfar and Jan Rypka, however, are less positive.

Jamal al-Din possibly had four children, two of them whom are known; Kamal al-Din Mahmud, who died before him, and Kamal al-Din Isfahani (died 1237) who surpassed him as a poet.

References

Sources 
 
 

Year of death unknown
Year of birth unknown
12th-century Iranian people
12th-century Persian-language poets
Writers from Isfahan
Poets from the Seljuk Empire